Rita Koiral (or Rita Kayral; c.1959 – 19 November 2017) was an Indian Bengali actress, especially known for her television and film roles. She appeared in several soap opera roles, often as villains and often opposite Monami Ghosh. Directors she worked with included Prabhat Roy, Agnidev Chatterjee and Aparna Sen. She also acted in jatra (a form of folk theatre).
Koiral was born in Kolkata, and was still living there at the time of her death. She obtained B.A and M.A. degrees in accountancy from Calcutta University. Later she joined Durdarshan Kendra Calcutta as its newsreader. 

Her first marriage was an arranged marriage to Soumitra Bannerjee, an actor who died in the year 2000 at the age of 46. Famous actor Jahar Ganguly was her maternal grandfather. She was estranged from her second husband, by whom she had one daughter named Amrita. She also had one son who died at an early age.

Career
In Anupam Kher's 2000 film Bariwali, Rita Koiral provided the voice for another Indian actress, Kirron Kher, the producer's wife, but she was not given the credit when Kher received a National Award for her role in the film. According to the rules, Kher should not have qualified for the award because the role was dubbed. Koiral claimed that Anupam Kher had offered her a share of the award money, but Kirron Kher denied that her part had been overdubbed. Following Koiral's death, The Times of India claimed that she "nursed the wound of being denied her due credit" for the rest of her life.

In addition to acting, Koiral ran a school of dance. She continued to act after being diagnosed with liver cancer, and died in hospital in Kolkata, aged 58.

Filmography
Atmaja (1996)
Asukh (1999)
Khelaghar (1999)
Paromitar Ek Din (2000)
Bor Asbe Ekhuni (2008)
Chirodini Tumi Je Amar (2008)
Mon Bole Priya Priya (2011)
Dutta Vs Dutta (2012)
Ganesh Talkies (2013)
Window Connection (2014)
Boro Bou
Gunda
Jiban Niye Khela (1999)
Rajmohol (2005)

Television
Rakhi Bandhan as Malina Chatterjee (later replaced by Chaitali Chakraborty) 
Saat Paake Bandha as Charu 
Ek Akasher Niche(2000-2005) (Zee Bangla)
Kon Se Alor Swapno Niye
Binni Dhanner Khoy 
Sonar Horin
Swade Ahladey
Stree as Sabitri Ghosh 
Mouchaak as Paroma Sen
Janani as Supriya Devi's (Janani) second daughter, and Partha Mukhopadhyay's wife

References

External links

1950s births
2017 deaths
Bengali actresses